Lexie Contursi (born September 18, 1989) is an American film and television actress. She starred in Laguna Beach: The Real Orange County while attending Laguna Beach High School in Laguna Beach, California. Contursi appeared in Katy Perry: Part of Me and VH1 Divas 2012. Her acting skill received praise from The Big Bang Theory show creator Chuck Lorre.

Early life and education
Contursi graduated from Laguna Beach High School in Laguna Beach, California; during her time attending this institution she starred on the third season of the television series Laguna Beach: The Real Orange County.

Career
Contursi was a contestant on So You Think You Can Dance in 2010. She focused on contemporary dance style.

In 2014 Contursi was credited in an appearance she had filmed for the television series The Big Bang Theory. She was one of two guest stars credited in the episode directed by Mark Cendrowski. Her filmed scene was subsequently cut from broadcast in the final aired version of the episode. Show creator Chuck Lorre commented upon this in the vanity card at the end of the episode. He noted the inherent irony in that the episode itself dealt with character Penny's response when she learns her scene was cut from the television show NCIS. Lorre characterized Contursi as "a very pretty and very talented young actress". Lorre utilized his vanity card to state: "I wanted to take this opportunity to tell Lexie, and all her friends and relatives, that she nailed the part. Just nailed it. The fact that it did not appear in tonight's episode had absolutely nothing to do with her performance."

Contursi was spotted in Hollywood on April 7, 2018 with Bachelor Alum Nick Vial.

Filmography

Film

Television

Dance

See also

California Dreams Tour
Chuck Lorre#Vanity cards
List of American film actresses
List of American television actresses
List of Laguna Beach: The Real Orange County cast members
List of Laguna Beach: The Real Orange County episodes
Television in the United States

Footnotes

References

Further reading

External links

Lexie Contursi, official YouTube channel

Living people
1989 births
American film actresses
American television actresses
Actresses from California
21st-century American women